This is a list of Italian locations of Jewish history. The first Jews arrived in Italy more than 2000 years ago and to this day have an unbroken presence in Italy. Today, Italian Jews can be found nearly all regions of Italy.

Northern Italy
Acqui
Alessandria
Ancona
Aquileia
Arezzo
Asti
Bassano
Bergamo
Bologna
Bolzano
Bozzolo
Brescia
Cento
Cesena
Como
Conegliano
Cremona
Cuneo
Emilia Romagna
Faenza
Florence
Forlì
Fossano
Genoa
Gorizia
Imola
Livorno
Lodi
Lombardy
Lucca
Lugo
Mantua
Merano
Milan
Modena
Moncalvo
Padua
Pavia
Pisa
Reggio Emilia
Sabbioneta
San Daniele Del Friuli
Siena
Trent
Treviso
Trieste
Turin
Tuscany
Venice
Vercelli
Vincenza
Vittorio Veneto

Central Italy
Amalfi
Aquila
Ascoli Piceno
Benevento
Capua
Fano
Ferrara
Gaeta
Lavello
Matera
Naples
Orvieto
Ostia
Papal States
Perugia
Pesaro
Piacenza
Piove di Sacco
Pitigliano
Pompeii
Ravenna
Rome
Salerno
Spoleto
Urbino
Viterbo

Southern Italy
Agrigento
Alghero
Apulia
Bari
Brindisi
Calabria
Catania
Catanzaro
Cosenza
Messina
Oria
Otranto
Reggio Calabria
San Nicandro Garganico
Sardinia
Sicily
Syracuse
Palermo
Taranto
Trani

References

www.jewishvirtuallibrary.org
www.jewishencyclopedia.com
www.dieli.net

Italian Jewish communities